Atomizer is the debut full-length album by American punk rock group Big Black released in 1986.

Singles
One song from the album, "Big Money", was released as a B-side to the "Il Duce" single prior to the release of Atomizer. Homestead Records also issued "Big Money" and "Il Duce" the A-side of a 12" record with three live songs on the B-side (including the live version of "Cables" that would appear on Atomizer) with the agreement that the 12" be used for promotional purposes only. The label sent the promo 12" to radio stations, then sold extra copies outside of Big Black's native Chicago, hoping the band would never find out. When they did, Big Black left Homestead and signed to Touch and Go Records.

Follow-up and CD releases
In the year after Atomizer's release, Big Black recorded their 4-song Headache EP and released it with a sticker that bore the words, "Warning! Not as good as Atomizer, so don't get your hopes up, cheese." The same sticker also appeared on some copies of Sonic Youth's EP Master=Dik. That same year Atomizer was compiled onto compact disc along with the Headache EP and the band's "Heartbeat" single under the name, The Rich Man's Eight Track Tape. The CD omitted track 9 "Strange Things", as well as the artwork and liner notes from the original records. Instead, Steve Albini expressed his general dislike for the compact disc format in the CD's liner notes, saying, "This compact disc, compiled to exploit those of you gullible enough to own the bastardly first generation digital music system, contains all-analog masters. Compact discs are quite durable, this being their only advantage over real music media. You should take every opportunity to scratch them, fingerprint them, and eat egg and bacon sandwiches off them. Don't worry about their longevity, as Philips will pronounce them obsolete when the next phase of the market-squeezing technology bonanza begins."

Reception

Reviewing for The Village Voice in September 1986, Robert Christgau wrote that, "Though they don't want you to know it, these hateful little twerps are sensitive souls—they're moved to make this godawful racket by the godawful pain of the world, which they learn about reading everything from textbooks to bondage mags. This is the brutal guitar machine thousands of lonely adolescent cowards have heard in their heads. Its creators deserve credit for finding each other and making their obsession real." 

"After countless rock and neo-industrial outfits attempted to one-up each other's levels of extremity over the years, Atomizer holds up extremely well" writes Andy Kellman of Allmusic, "It's not every day that one hears a song considering self-immolation as "just something to do" or another that tackles the case of an alleged parent-child molestation ring from the viewpoint of the offender. Instrumentally, Atomizer is a wailing behemoth of assaultive Roland beats, Steve Albini and Santiago Durango's clanging and whirring guitars, and new member Dave Riley's lumberjack bass." He describes the song "Kerosene" as "undeniably Big Black's brightest/bleakest moment, an epically roaming track that features an instantly memorable guitar intro, completely incapable of being accurately described by vocal imitation or physical gesture. It's also Albini at his most plainspoken and bleak: "Stare at the wall/Stare at each other and wait 'til we die." It's Big Black's "Light My Fire," literally." He concludes by calling it "as horrifying as the day it was recorded."

Accolades

In addition to the ones mentioned below, the album was included in the book 1001 Albums You Must Hear Before You Die.

Covers

The song "Kerosene" has been covered by Kerbdog (as a b-side to their single "End of Green"), Pitchshifter (on the "enhanced" version of their album Deviant), Lamb of God (on their album Legion: XX, under their original name Burn the Priest) and St. Vincent (live at the Our Band Could Be Your Life 10th Anniversary Show at New York’s Bowery Ballroom on May 22, 2011. It was named by Consequence of Sound as one of her best covers.).

Track listing

Personnel
 Steve Albini - guitar, vocals, drum machine programming
 Santiago Durango - guitar
 Dave Riley - bass guitar
 Iain Burgess - recording engineer

Big Black always credited Roland along with the band's members, though Roland is a brand of drum machine and not an actual person.

See also
Jordan, Minnesota sexual abuse scandal

References

Big Black albums
1986 debut albums
Homestead Records albums
Touch and Go Records albums
Blast First albums